Scellus virago is a species of long-legged fly in the family Dolichopodidae.

References

Hydrophorinae
Articles created by Qbugbot
Diptera of North America
Insects described in 1907
Taxa named by John Merton Aldrich